Stewardship is an ethical value that embodies the responsible planning and management of resources. The concepts of stewardship can be applied to the environment and nature, economics, health, property, information, theology, cultural resources etc.

History of the term
Stewardship was originally made up of the tasks of a domestic steward, from stiġ (house, hall) and weard, (ward, guard, guardian, keeper). Stewardship in the beginning referred to the household servant's duties for bringing food and drink to the castle's dining hall. Stewardship responsibilities were eventually expanded to include the domestic, service and management needs of the entire household.

Commercial stewardship tends to the domestic and service requirements of passengers on ships, trains, airplanes or guests in restaurants.  This concept of stewardship continues to be referenced within these specific categories.  

Stewardship is now generally recognized as the acceptance or assignment of responsibility to shepherd and safeguard the valuables of others.

Notable organizations 
 Forest Stewardship Council, since 1993
 Marine Stewardship Council, since 1996
 Aquaculture Stewardship Council, since 2010
 Alliance for Water Stewardship, since 2017
 Stewardship Italia, since 2012
 ETICAE-Stewardship in Action, since 2014

See also
 Antimicrobial stewardship
 Data steward
 Environmental ethics
 Environmental stewardship
 Nuclear stockpile stewardship
 Product stewardship
 Safer Detergents Stewardship Initiative
 Stewardship (theology)
 Stewardship theory

References

12. ^ Annalisa Casino. 2014. Stewardship. Politiche e pratiche per una gestione etica delle risorse.Aracne Editrice. 

13. ^ Annalisa Casino. 2018. Stewardship: la nuova sostenibilità?Aracne Editrice.

External links

 NOAA Planet Stewards Educational Project
The NOAA Planet Stewards Education Project (PSEP) is an example of an environmental stewardship program in the United States to advance scientific literacy especially in areas that conserve, restore, and protect human communities and natural resources in the areas of climate, ocean, and atmosphere. It includes professional teachers of students of all ages and abilities, and informal educators who work with the public in nature and science centers, aquaria, and zoos. The project began in 2008 as the NOAA Climate Stewards Project. Its name was changed to NOAA Planet Stewards Educational Project in 2016. 

Resources
Natural resource management
Applied ethics